Potassium osmate is the inorganic compound with the formula K2[OsO2(OH)4]. This diamagnetic purple salt contains osmium in the VI (6+) oxidation state.  When dissolved in water a pink solution is formed but when dissolved in methanol, the salt gives a blue solution.  The salt gained attention as a catalyst for the asymmetric dihydroxylation of olefins.

Structure
The complex anion is octahedral.  Like related d2 dioxo complexes, the oxo ligands are trans.  The Os=O and Os-OH distances are 1.75(2) and 1.99(2) Å, respectively.  It is a relatively rare example of a metal oxo complex that obeys the 18e rule.

Preparation
The compound was first reported by Edmond Frémy in 1844. Potassium osmate is prepared by reducing osmium tetroxide with ethanol:
2 OsO4  +  C2H5OH  +  5 KOH →  CH3CO2K  +  2 K2[OsO2(OH)4]
Alkaline oxidative fusion of osmium metal also affords this salt.

See also
Sodium hexachloroosmate

References

Osmium compounds
Oxides
Potassium compounds
Transition metal oxyanions